Buenavista Station (Spanish: Estación Buenavista), also called Buenavista Terminal  (Spanish: Terminal Buenavista), was a passenger train station in Mexico City. The station opened in 1873 and since 1909, the station was fully operated by Ferrocarriles Nacionales de México. The station was closed in 2005. By June 2008, the station was replaced by the terminus of the Tren Suburbano commuter rail service.

History 

The station served to inaugurate passenger rail service in Mexico on January 20, 1873, when Ferrocarriles Nacionales de México ran its first passenger rail trip from Mexico City to the Port of Veracruz. Among the passengers of the inaugural trip was Sebastián Lerdo de Tejada, President of Mexico at the time. The rail trip took three days due to a number of official presidential events along the route.

The original structure was demolished by Ferrocarriles Nacionales de México in 1958 to construct a new station nearby.  The plot on which the original station stood was redeveloped. Buenavista Station was re-inaugurated in 1961 by President Adolfo López Mateos.

The headquarters of Ferrocarriles Nacionales de México were built in front of the station and to the north of the station, an automated postal facility was constructed. To the south of the station, the borough hall of the Borough of Cuauhtémoc was inaugurated in September 1976. The traffic circle in front of the station holds a statue of Christopher Columbus, which was inaugurated on October 12, 1892, in celebration of the 400-year anniversary of the explorer's discovery of America.

The principal intercity destinations served by Buenavista station were:

 Cuernavaca, Morelos
 Guadalajara, Jalisco
 Querétaro, Querétaro
 Veracruz, Veracruz
 Monterrey, Nuevo León
 Mérida, Yucatán
 Ciudad Juárez, Chihuahua
 Nuevo Laredo, Tamaulipas
 Durango, Durango
 Aguascalientes, Aguascalientes
 San Luis Potosí, San Luis Potosí
 Oaxaca, Oaxaca
 Morelia, Michoacán

Ferrocarriles Nacionales de México used the train terminal for passenger train traffic to connect the United States, Guatemala, and Belize with other Mexican cities.

See also 
 Rail transport in Mexico
 List of Mexican railroads

References

External links

Cuauhtémoc, Mexico City
Railway stations opened in 1873
Railway stations opened in 1961
Railway stations closed in 1958
Railway stations closed in 2005